Euphrosine is a genus of polychaetes belonging to the family Euphrosinidae.

The genus has cosmopolitan distribution.

Species:

Euphrosine abyssalis 
Euphrosine affinis 
Euphrosine arctia 
Euphrosine arctica
Euphrosine armadillo 
Euphrosine armadilloides 
Euphrosine armata 
Euphrosine aurantiaca 
Euphrosine balani
Euphrosine bicirrata 
Euphrosine borealis 
Euphrosine calypta 
Euphrosine capensis 
Euphrosine ceylonica 
Euphrosine cirrata 
Euphrosine cirrataepropinqua 
Euphrosine cirribranchis 
Euphrosine digitalis 
Euphrosine dumosa 
Euphrosine echidna 
Euphrosine filosa 
Euphrosine foliosa 
Euphrosine globosa 
Euphrosine heterobranchia 
Euphrosine hortensis 
Euphrosine hystrix 
Euphrosine keldyshi 
Euphrosine laureata 
Euphrosine laureata 
Euphrosine limbata 
Euphrosine longesetosa 
Euphrosine maculata 
Euphrosine magellanica 
Euphrosine maorica 
Euphrosine mastersi 
Euphrosine monroi 
Euphrosine mucosa 
Euphrosine multibranchiata 
Euphrosine myrtosa 
Euphrosine myrtosa 
Euphrosine notialis 
Euphrosine obiensis 
Euphrosine orientalis 
Euphrosine panamica 
Euphrosine pelagica 
Euphrosine pilosa 
Euphrosine polyclada 
Euphrosine pseudonotialis 
Euphrosine ramosa 
Euphrosine samoana 
Euphrosine setosissima 
Euphrosine sibogae 
Euphrosine superba 
Euphrosine tosaensis 
Euphrosine triloba 
Euphrosine tripartita 
Euphrosine uruguayensis 
Euphrosine zaveruchi

References

Annelids